The 1933 NSWRFL season was the twenty-sixth season of Sydney’s professional rugby league club competition, Australia’s first. Eight teams from across the city contested the New South Wales Rugby Football League premiership during the season, which lasted from April until September, and culminated in Newtown’s victory over St. George in the final.

Season summary
When the Kangaroos sailed for England in July, the NSWRFL premiership, with a mere five rounds completed, was turned on its head. After losing the opening four matches of the season, last-placed Newtown won eleven of their next twelve matches to take the premiership, whilst Wests, who had won four and drawn one of six games, lost several key players and did not win another match. The Magpies lost virtually their entire backline of McMillan, Pearce, Ridley, Mead and the up-and-coming Vic Hey, and also suffered from their refusal to reappoint coach Jim Craig.

Teams
 Balmain, formed on January 23, 1908, at Balmain Town Hall
 Eastern Suburbs, formed on January 24, 1908, at Paddington Town Hall
 Newtown, formed on January 14, 1908
 North Sydney, formed on February 7, 1908
 South Sydney, formed on January 17, 1908, at Redfern Town Hall
 St. George, formed on November 8, 1920, at Kogarah School of Arts
 Western Suburbs, formed on February 4, 1908
 University, formed in 1919 at Sydney University

Ladder

Finals
In the two semi finals, Newtown and St. George beat their opponents Eastern Suburbs and South Sydney. In their semi-final Newtown were reduced to twelve men after former representative fullback Alan Righton broke his leg. The two winners then advanced to the final.

Premiership final
The Sydney Sports Ground attracted a large crowd of 18,080 on 9 September to see Newtown take on St George. Both teams were coached by former internationals. St George captain-coach was former Kangaroo and premiership winner with South Sydney Harry 'Mick' Kadwell. Newtown were coached by former dual-international  Charles “Boxer” Russell.

The match, refereed by William Fry, was level 5–all at halftime, before the Bluebags finished the stronger to take the premiership.

Newtown 18 (Tries: Alf Griffiths 2, Joe Gartner, George Braybrook. Goals: Frank Gilmore 3)

beat

St George 5 (Tries: Percy Fairall. Goal: Mick Kadwell )

References

External links
 Rugby League Tables - Notes AFL Tables
 Rugby League Tables - Season 1933 AFL Tables
 Premiership History and Statistics RL1908
 
Results: 1931-40 at rabbitohs.com.au

New South Wales Rugby League premiership
Nswrfl Season